PickMe is a Sri Lankan taxi hailing and delivery app developed by Digital Mobility Solutions (Pvt) Ltd. It launched in June 2015. The app is available in English, Sinhala and Tamil on Android and iOS. By 2021 the company had 8000 registered users.  PickMe has access to Tuk, Flex (Small Hatchbacks), Mini (Large Hatchbacks), Car (Sedans), Minivan (Microvans capable of seating six passengers) and Luxury (VIP) cars.

History

Jiffry Zulfer is the founding CEO. He is a serial entrepreneur. Prior to PickMe, he was CTO and part of the founding management of anything.lk. Zulfer was awarded the ICTA Young IT Professional Award (May 2006) and FCCISL Young Entrepreneur of the Year Award (April 2004). Zulfer saw an opportunity to build a technology in Sri Lanka for hailing taxis similar to those in other countries.

Zulfer approached colleagues in the local ICT space and recruited a team to develop a Sri Lankan taxi-hailing app. Zulfer convinced Ajit Gunewardene to fund the firm's expansion. Joining Ajit were Ruchi Gunewardene and other private investors including Interblocks Ltd., Lanka Orix information Technology Services Ltd., H Capital (PVT) Ltd., MAS Capital (PVT) Ltd. Gunewardene is chairman of PickMe.

In September 2015, PickMe raised 150 million rupees in private funding. By June 2017, 6.5 million rides in total had been completed, with 35,000 rides happening daily, and the number of customers stood at around 620,000.

YAMU acquisition

PickMe acquired YAMU, a food and hotel review site, in July 2019. At the time YAMU had 325,000 monthly active users and 615,000 monthly pageviews.

COVID-19 response

During the COVID-19 pandemic in Sri Lanka, PickMe utilised innovations such as displaying the vaccination status of the driver, providing cash incentives for passengers riding to the nearest vaccination center, contact tracing, and installation of separators and hand sanitization facilities. PickMe's Flash delivery service was used by restaurants to deliver over 8200 orders during the lockdowns.

Technology

PickMe's backend services follow a Microservices architecture, with over 100 microservices. It utilises Google Cloud Platform and Microsoft Azure, is deployed using Docker and Kubernetes, and uses Apache Kafka as a messaging service. The data science platform uses Apache Hadoop, Apache Spark, and Apache Hive. PickMe's micoservices are written in Go.

References

 
 
 
 
 
 
 
 
 

Economy of Colombo
Information technology companies of Sri Lanka
Taxi companies
Transport companies established in 2014